The Hungary national beach soccer team represents Hungary in international beach soccer competitions and is controlled by the Magyar Labdarúgó Szövetség, the governing body for football in Hungary.

Competitive record

FIFA Beach Soccer World Cup Qualification (UEFA)

Current squad
Correct as of July 2012

Coach: Tamás Weisz

HFF Head of Beach Soccer: Zsolt Izsvak

References

External links 
strandfoci.hu 

European national beach soccer teams
Beach soccer in Hungary
beach soccer